NoName057(16) is a pro-Russian hacker group that declared itself in March 2022. They have claimed responsibility for cyber attacks on counties such as Ukraine, the United States, and other various European countries. These attacks are typically carried out on government agencies, media, and private company websites.

Activity 
Information about the attacks carried out by NoName057(16) is published in the Telegram messenger channel of the same name. 
According to the Ukrainian media, the group is also involved  in sending threatening letters to Ukrainian journalists. This was also stated by the Ukrainian ex-ombudsman Lyudmila Denisova. 
Hackers from NoName057(16) gained their popularity during a series of massive DDOS attacks on Lithuanian websites. According to pro-Russian hackers, by doing so they "revenge" the Lithuanian authorities for banning the transit of Russian cargo from the Kaliningrad region. 
OSINT researcher (nickname Cyberknow20) has included NoName057(16) in his summary table of hacker groups, which he periodically updates.

Known DDOS attacks

Ukrainian sites 
Starting from March 2022, the NoName057(16) group has carried out a number of cyber attacks on Ukrainian media websites and Ukrainian media portals. For example, the portal "Detector Media", the website "Odessa Online", the news agency "Konkurent".

Baltic sites

Latvia 
The DDOS attack claimed by the NoName057(16) group disrupted the online train ticket sales system on the website and in the mobile application of the Latvian company Passenger Train (Pasažieru vilciens). The company representatives stated in their Twitter account they had to stop selling tickets on the site and in the application because of the incident.

Lithuania 
On June 21, representatives of the hacker group NoName 057(16) announced on their Telegram channel that they were joining the attacks on the websites of the Republic of Lithuania. In their appeal, they called on other communities of pro-Russian hackers, as well as individual hacktivists, to do the same. The hackers called their actions "revenge for Kaliningrad". 
As a result, in about a month, the group carried out more than 200 attacks on Lithuanian Internet infrastructure resources. 
The Lithuanian Ministry of Defense stated that the participants in the attacks were pro-Russian "volunteer activists". 
In particular, the group attacked the website of the Lithuanian company Ingstad, the websites of Lithuanian airports and other Internet resources. 
In addition to DDOS attacks on Lithuanian sites, hackers from NoName057(16) managed to perform a so-called deface on one of them. As a result, a message from hackers appeared on the main page of the resource of the logistics company ExpressTrip.

United States 
Also, hackers from NoName057(16) carried out attacks on the websites of American companies from various fields of activity. 
As a result of one of these attacks the website of the ITT company ceased to be available to users for a long time.

Denmark 
The group claimed responsibility for DDOS attacks on the sites of a number of businesses in the financial sector, along with the Ministry of Finance in January 2023, due to the Danish support to Ukraine.

Norway 
As a kind of protest against the decision of the Norwegian authorities to ban the delivery of goods to Russian citizens in the Svalbard archipelago, the NoName057(16) group organized attacks on a number of sites in Norway. The attacks were noticed by the local media.

Poland 
The group also carried out DDOS attacks against Poland's Internet infrastructure in different periods of time.

Finland 
A cyber attack on the website of the Finnish Parliament was covered in media significantly. Finnish journalists ranked the group as pro-Russian.

As a result of the incident, the Finnish criminal police launched a preliminary investigation.

Czech Republic 
During the 2023 presidential elections on January 13, 2023, the website of presidential candidate General Petr Pavel has been under a strong hacker attack since Friday morning. That's why it was not loading for some users, his election team said. It is said that the website faced a similarly strong attack throughout Wednesday. According to the operator, the attack was conducted from various IP addresses across Europe.

Italy  
Following the visit of Prime Minister Giorgia Meloni to Kiev, in support of Ukraine's efforts in the ongoing conflict with Russia, a series of Italian companies' and institutions' were attacked in February and March.

After the resignation of the general directory of Italy's National Cybersecurity Agency (Agenzia per la cybersicurezza italiana) Roberto Baldoni the group falsely claimed that the director was removed by the government because of the attacks: indeed multiple sources reported that the resignation was due to disagreements with the new Italian government.

References 

Cyberattack gangs
Hacking in the 2020s